Bonjour is the eighth studio album by French–Algerian singer Rachid Taha. It was released by Wrasse Records on 26 October 2009.

Critical response 

Bonjour received mixed reviews from music critics. The Guardian reviewer Robin Denselow called the album a "A highly commercial set" that was "not [Taha's] most exciting." David Honigmann of the Financial Times rated the album three out of five stars, but wrote that its emphasis on "technology...stops [Taha] cutting loose."

Songs 
"Je t'aime mon amour", Bonjour's opening track, was written about Taha's partner. Its lyrics are a declaration of love for life and his partner. The second track, "Mokhtar", describes the lonely life of a vagrant living in a city. "Ha Baby" was inspired by country music singer Kenny Rogers and Egyptian musician Farid El Atrache. The song, which blends western and Arabic musical styles, is about universal peace and love. The title track, "Bonjour", is a duet with Gaetan Roussel. It was released as the album's lead single and is sung in both French and Arabic. "Mine Jaï", the fifth track, asks a series of questions. In the song, Taha asks the listener where they come from and where they are traveling to.

In the song "Mabrouk Aalik", Taha reflects on the fractured relationship between Jews and Muslims. The seventh track, "Ila Lika", explores life and death. "It's an Arabian Song" is a rock song about the French treatment of Algerians during colonialism. The track features fellow Algerian singer Bruno Maman. "Sélu" is a flamenco song that pays tribute Arab writers and philosophers such as Averroes and Naguib Mahfouz. The album closes with "Agi", a ballad about love.

Track listing 
 "Je t'aime mon amour"
 "Mokhtar"
 "Ha Baby"
 "Bonjour" with Gaetan Roussel
 "Mine Jaï"
 "Mabrouk Aalik"
 "Ila Lika"
 "It's an Arabian Song" with Bruno Maman
 "Sélu"
 "Agi"

Charts

Release history

Personnel
 Rachid Taha: Composer, Primary Artist
 Sylvain Bernard: Clapping, Keyboards, Organ, Piano, Piano (Electric), Vocals (Background) 
 Everett Bradley: Vocals (Background) 
 Rodolphe Burger: Guitar (Electric) 
 Marc Copely: Guitar (Acoustic), Guitar (Electric), Vocals (Background) 
 Hakim Hamadouche: Arranger, Banjo, Guitar (Acoustic), Vocals (Background) 
 Steve Hillage: Arranger 
 Bruno Maman: Composer, Featured Artist, Guitar (Electric), Interpretation, Synthesizer Bass, Synthesizer Strings, Vocals 
 Karim Mansour: Guitar (Electric) 
 Morgan Marchand: Clapping, Drum Programming, Keyboards, Percussion Programming, Synthesizer Bass 
 Konrad Meissner: Drums 
 Daniel Mintseris: Harmonium, Keyboards 
 Mark Plati: Bass, Guitar (Acoustic), Guitar (Electric), Keyboards, Loops, Mixing, Producer, Programming, Synthesizer Bass, Vocals (Background) 
 Nicki Richards: Vocals (Background) 
 Gaëtan Roussel: Composer, Featured Artist, Guitar (Acoustic), Guitar (Electric), Interpretation, Keyboards, Loops, Piano, Producer, Vocals (Background) 
 Catherine Russell: Vocals (Background) 
 Arthur Simon: Trumpet 
 Sóley: Clapping, Guitar (Acoustic), Guitar (Electric), Vocals (Background) 
Source:

References

External links 
Official website

2009 albums
Rachid Taha albums